...Phobia is the second studio album by electronic musicians Benassi Bros., released in 2005. It is the follow-up to their debut album Pumphonia. It went gold in France, followed by huge acclaims for the singles "Every Single Day" and "Make Me Feel".

A part of the "Feel Alive"s melody is based on a remix of the main guitar riff from Eric Clapton's 1970 hit "Layla".

Track listing

Note: "Rocket in the Sky" and "Feel Alive" were re-recorded when they were released as singles replaced with Dhany and Sandy, respectively.

Singles
 "Make Me Feel"
 "Every Single Day"
 "Rocket in the Sky"
 "Feel Alive"
 "Castaway"

Certifications

References

External links
 

2005 albums
Benassi Bros. albums